Pohjois-Tapiola is a district of the municipality of Espoo, Finland.

See also
 Districts of Espoo

References 

Districts of Espoo